The Congregation of France (French: Labaye de Sainte Genevieve et la Congregation de France lit: The Abbey of Sainte Genevieve and the Congregation of France) was a congregation of houses of canons regular in France.. Its members were called Génovéfains after the Abbey of St Genevieve, the motherhouse of the congregation. The religious clothes that they wore were white, covered by a linen rochet, and a black cloak for outside the abbey.

The congregation was founded by Cardinal de La Rochefoucauld, commendatory abbot of the motherhouse. The congregation was aimed to restore the Augustinian abbey's rigorous observance promoted by the Catholic Church following the Council of Trent.

In the eighteenth century the order had 107 monasteries and over 1300 canons, who primarily cared for the sick in their hospitals and almshouses.

References

Sources
 Pierre Féret (1883): L'Abbaye de Sainte-Geneviève et la Congrégation de France: précédées de la vie de la patronne de Paris, d'après des documents inédits

Christian organizations based in France
Christian organizations established in the 17th century
Canons regular